The Wingham Ironmen are a Junior ice hockey team based in Wingham, Ontario, Canada.  They began play in the Northern Junior D Hockey League and eventually moved up to the Western Junior C Hockey League  where they played until the 2016-17 season when the league became part of the Provincial Junior Hockey League (PJHL)  as the Pollock Division.

History

Founded in 1973, the Ironmen started out in Northern Junior D Hockey League where they played for six seasons.  After some success at the Junior D level, the Ironmen joined the Central Junior C Hockey League in 1979.

In 1980, the league changed its name to the Grey-Bruce Junior C Hockey League to reflect the centralization of the league in Grey-Bruce counties region.  The Ironmen won the league playoffs that year and advanced to the Clarence Schmalz Cup playoffs for the first time. Unfortunately, the Ironmen lost to the eventual finalist Essex 73's 4 games-to-1. 

After two poor seasons, the Ironmen stormed back to the top of the standings winning the league and advancing to the Schmalz Cup playoffs yet again in 1984. However, the Great Lakes Junior Hockey League's Dresden Kings overwhelmed the Ironmen in four straight games to advance to the semi-finals.

In 1988, the Ironmen had a strong season by finishing second in the regular season standings and advancing to the playoff finals,  However, the Ironmen did not participate in league play the following 1989-90 season.

In 2003-04, the Ironmen won the Western league title and went on to compete in the All-Ontario Clarence Schmalz Cup playoffs.  In the quarter-final round, the Ironmen defeated the Stayner Siskens of the Georgian Mid-Ontario Junior C Hockey League in a hard fought seven game series.  Waiting for them in the semi-finals were the Dresden Kings but the Ironmen were ready.  Wingham made quick work of Dresden emerging with a 4-games-to-1 series win.  In the finals, their competition was the Niagara Junior C Hockey League's Grimsby Peach Kings who swept the Ironmen to win the provincial title.

The 2004-05 season saw the Ironmen take first place in the league.  In the league semi-final, the played against the fourth seeded Goderich Sailors and defeated them 4-games-to-none.  In the league final, the Ironmen drew their most common foe, the Kincardine Bulldogs.  In a hard fought battle, the Ironmen found themselves down 3-games-to-2 to the Bulldogs.  In Game 6, the Ironmen came to play and defeating the Bulldogs 5-1.  The decisive Game 7 ended with a 4-2 victory for Wingham.  As Western league champions, the Ironmen found themselves competing for the Schmalz Cup again.  In the provincial quarter-final, the Ironmen drew the Georgian Mid-Ontario Junior C Hockey League's Erin Shamrocks.  The Ironmen defeated them 4-games-to-2.  In the semi-finals, the Ironmen drew the challenging Great Lakes Junior C Hockey League's Essex 73's.  The 73's were too much for the Ironmen to handle and they swept Wingham 4-games-to-none.

In 2005-06, the Ironmen finished in first place again.  They received a bye to the league semi-final.  In the semi-final, the Ironmen were up against the Walkerton Hawks, whom they swept 4-games-to-none.  In the league final, the Ironmen mixed it up with the Kincardine Bulldogs but were eliminated 4-games-to-1.

The 2006-07 regular season ended with the Ironmen in second place.  They again had a bye to the league semi-final.  In the semi-final, the Ironmen ran into the  Walkerton Hawks squad who defeated the Ironmen, 4-games-to-none.

Season-by-season standings

(*) The 1999-00 Season was altered drastically due to the folding of the Lakeshore Pirates.  As a disproportionate number of games had been played by each team against Lakeshore, all history of these games were erased.
1979-1981 & 1982-1996
1981-1982
1996-2004
2004–Present

Clarence Schmalz Cup appearances
2004: Grimsby Peach Kings defeated Wingham Ironmen 4-games-to-none

References

External links
Ironmen Webpage

Ice hockey teams in Ontario